Drewry Ice Stream is an ice stream in eastern Ellsworth Land that flows southwest from the area between the Behrendt Mountains and Mount Hassage into Evans Ice Stream. Named by the UK Antarctic Place-names Committee for Professor David John Drewry, former Director of Scott Polar Research Institute and the British Antarctic Survey.

References

Ice streams of Ellsworth Land